Double Trouble Two is an album by Barry Guy and the London Jazz Composers' Orchestra with guest artists Irène Schweizer (piano), Marilyn Crispell (piano), and Pierre Favre (drums). Documenting a large-scale, 47-minute composition by Guy, it was recorded in December 1995 in Zürich, Switzerland, and was released in 1998 by Intakt Records.

The title refers to the fact that the work was originally conceived as a double concerto for pianists Howard Riley and Alexander von Schlippenbach, joined by the combined forces of the London Jazz Composers' Orchestra and the Globe Unity Orchestra. An earlier recording of the work, Double Trouble, was issued by Intakt in 1990.

Reception

In a review for AllMusic, Steve Loewy wrote that the album "is filled with remarkable moments, particularly the performances by pianists Irene Schweizer and Marilyn Crispell... The ensemble work borders on the spectacular, too... devotees of the group will want this in their collection."

The authors of The Penguin Guide to Jazz Recordings awarded the album a full 4 stars, and stated: "Crispell and Schweizer have collaborated in a number of contexts. This must be one of the most powerful. It is a culminating moment for the LJCO."

Glenn Astarita of All About Jazz commented: "Music of this ilk provides a workout for one's imagination as the interpretations are bound to be diverse or perhaps subjected to ongoing debates or food for thought. That's where the magic lies. Double Trouble Two is an unfolding drama which gives purpose and reason to this thing we call 'free' or avant-garde jazz."

Track listing

 "Double Trouble Two" (Barry Guy) – 47:24

Personnel 
 Barry Guy – bass, conductor
 Evan Parker – reeds
 Trevor Watts – reeds
 Paul Dunmall – reeds
 Peter McPhail – reeds
 Simon Picard – reeds
 Henry Lowther – trumpet
 Jon Corbett – trumpet
 Marc Charig – cornet
 Paul Rutherford – trombone
 Alan Tomlinson – trombone
 Chris Bridges – trombone
 Robin Hayward – tuba
 Philipp Wachsmann – violin
 Irène Schweizer – piano
 Marilyn Crispell – piano
 Barre Phillips – bass
 Paul Lytton – drums
 Pierre Favre – drums

References

1998 albums
Barry Guy albums
Intakt Records albums